The 1999–2000 Tetley's Bitter Rugby Union County Championship was the 100th edition of England's County Championship rugby union club competition.

Yorkshire won their 13th title, after defeating Devon in the final.

Final

See also
 English rugby union system
 Rugby union in England

References

Rugby Union County Championship
County Championship (rugby union) seasons